Ipplepen Priory was an Augustinian monastic house in the English county of Devon.

Ipplepen Augustinian priory was founded circa 1143, dependant on the Abbey of St Pierre de Rille, near Fougères. The Priory of Ipplepen is mentioned in a Bishop's register of 1274 and was dissolved circa 1414.

References

See also
List of monastic houses in Devon

Monasteries in Devon
1143 establishments in England
Christian monasteries established in the 12th century
1414 disestablishments in England
Augustinian monasteries in England
Grade II listed buildings in Devon
Grade II listed churches in Devon